Seydi (also Romanized as Şeydī, Şayādī, and Şayyādī; also known as Şeyd and Şayyād) is a village in Jam Rural District, in the Central District of Jam County, Bushehr Province, Iran. At the 2006 census, its population was 482, in 100 families.

References 

Populated places in Jam County